Palestine Legal is an advocacy group focused on defending people who support Palestinian rights. The group is headquartered in Chicago, Illinois. Its founder and director is Dima Khalidi, a Palestinian born in Beirut and raised in the US.

Activity 
In 2015, Palestine Legal published a report with the Center for Constitutional Rights about what the two organizations described as "the Palestine exception to free speech." During the first four months of 2015, the organization reported responding to 102 requests from university students and faculty for legal aid, most of them involving accusations of support for terrorism and antisemitism.

In 2019, Palestine Legal lawyers reported responding to more than 180 attempts to suppress the speech of students and academics supporting Palestinian rights.

In May 2021, Truthout reported that Palestine Legal had been tracking bills that would harm advocacy for Palestinian rights since 2014.

References 

Arab-American culture in Chicago
Civil liberties advocacy groups in the United States
Legal advocacy organizations in the United States
Palestinian-American culture